Gastre (from Tehuelche Gástrrek, meaning "shrub") is a village in Chubut Province, Argentina. It is the head town of the Gastre Department. It was founded in 1904. The place was the center of a controversy in the early 1990s when Argentina's National Atomic Energy Commission proposed to build a deep borehole disposal in the area. It was intended for radioactive waste to stay in the area for "1,000 years" until the radiation reached a non-lethal level.

Notes

External links

Populated places in Chubut Province
Populated places established in 1904